Valasca is a woman mentioned in the History of Bohemia by Aeneas Silvius (Pope Pius II). She was also called Vlasta and was supporter of the mythical Bohemian Princess Libuše.

Life 
On the death of Libuše ca. 738, Valasca seized power and created a state ruled by women.

She decreed that only women were to receive military training and that boys were to be maimed to render them unable to fight by removal of the right eye and thumb. She supposedly distributed a potion to the women of Bohemia which protected them from men. She was slain by Primislaus in battle after seven years of rule, at which point men regained power. 

Her headquarters were traditionally believed to have been located in Dívčí Hrad ("The Virgin’s Castle") on Mount Vidovole.

In popular culture
A character called Velasca in popular TV series Xena: Warrior Princess was loosey based on Valasca.

Sources

Rothery, Guy Cadogan, The Amazons, 1910, Chapter VI: "Amazons of Europe"

8th-century women rulers
Czech culture
Women in medieval European warfare